The 2005–06 Copa Federación de España was the 13th staging of the Copa Federación de España, a knockout competition for Spanish football clubs in Segunda División B and Tercera División.

The competition began in August 2006 with the Regional stages and ended with the finals on 5 and 19 April 2006.

Autonomous Communities tournaments

Asturias tournament

Qualifying tournament

Group A

Group B

Group C

Group D

Semifinals

|}

Final

|}

Castile and León tournament

Navarre tournament

|}

National tournament

National Qualifying round

|}

Round of 32

|}

Round of 16

|}

Quarter-finals

|}

Semifinals

|}

Final

|}

References
2000–2009 Copa Federación results

Copa Federación de España seasons